Mark Clifford Molesley (born 11 March 1981) is an English football manager and former professional player who is manager of Gosport Borough. He played in the Football League for Bournemouth, Aldershot Town, Plymouth Argyle and Exeter City, and the Football Conference for Hayes, Cambridge City, Aldershot Town, Stevenage Borough and Grays Athletic.

Playing career
Molesley started his career with Hayes, coming through their youth system. Spells with Cambridge City, Aldershot Town, Stevenage Borough and Grays Athletic followed before a transfer to Bournemouth.

He made his debut for Bournemouth, away to Shrewsbury Town, in a 4–1 defeat in the League Two on 18 October 2008.

Molesley signed for Exeter City on 18 January 2013. On 30 April 2013, he was released by Exeter due to the expiry of his contract.

Managerial career

Molesley Began his coaching career in 2015 by coaching Bournemouth under 15's.

Whilst playing for Weymouth in 2016, Molesley became a player-coach for the team.

Molesley became the manager of League Two club Southend United on 13 August 2020 on a three-year contract. After seven months, on 9 April 2021 Molesley was sacked by Southend United following a period of poor results and the club in 23rd place in the league.

On 20 September 2021, Molesley returned to Aldershot Town as manager on a deal until the end of the 2022–23 season. Tom Prodomo joined as assistant manager after previously working with Molesley at Weymouth and Southend. Molesley was also joined by Terry Brown who had previously managed both the Shots and Molesley himself.

On 15 October 2022, Molesley was sacked by Aldershot Town following a 2-0 defeat to Chelmsford City in the 2022-2023 FA Cup 4th qualifying round.

Moleley was appointed the manager of Southern League Premier South side Gosport Borough on 30th November 2022.

Personal life
Molesley married his partner, Charlene, in 2009. He lives in Bournemouth and Rickmansworth.

Career statistics

Managerial record

References

External links
Mark Molesley player profile at afcb.co.uk

1981 births
Footballers from Bournemouth
Footballers from Hillingdon
Living people
Association football midfielders
English footballers
English football managers
England semi-pro international footballers
Hayes F.C. players
Cambridge City F.C. players
Aldershot Town F.C. players
Stevenage F.C. players
Grays Athletic F.C. players
AFC Bournemouth players
Plymouth Argyle F.C. players
Exeter City F.C. players
Weymouth F.C. players
National League (English football) players
Isthmian League players
English Football League players
Weymouth F.C. managers
Southend United F.C. managers
Aldershot Town F.C. managers
Association football coaches